Institution Sainte Jeanne-Antide is a French school for girls, located in Alexandria, Egypt.

History
In 1934, the Sisters of Charity, from Besançon, built the Holy Institution Jeanne-Antide.

Demographics
Today, the school comprises more than 1000 students from pre-kindergarten to High school.

External links 

 http://www.jeanne-antide-eg.org
 https://web.archive.org/web/20080218151218/http://membres.lycos.fr/antide/

French international schools in Egypt
Education in Alexandria
Private schools in Alexandria
International schools in Alexandria
Girls' schools in Egypt
Educational institutions established in 1934
1934 establishments in Egypt